Wallatiri (Aymara wallata snow ball, snow lump; Andean goose, -(i)ri a suffix, translated as "abundance of Andean geese" or "habitat of the Andean geese", hispanicized spelling Huallatiri) is a mountain in the Andes of Bolivia, about  high. It is situated in the Oruro Department, Poopó Province, Poopó Municipality. Wallatiri lies south of Qala Pirqata.

References 

Mountains of Oruro Department